Serdica (in older sources also Srdica; Prekmurje Slovene: Srdica) is a village in the Municipality of Rogašovci in the Prekmurje region of northeastern Slovenia.

References

External links

Serdica on Geopedia

Populated places in the Municipality of Rogašovci